The 1985 Akron Zips football team represented Akron University in the 1985 NCAA Division I-AA football season as members of the Ohio Valley Conference. They were led by thirteenth-year head coach Jim Dennison, in his final season with the Zips. The Zips played their home games at the Rubber Bowl in Akron, Ohio. They finished the season with a record of 8–4 overall and 5–2 in OVC play to tie for second place.

Schedule

References

Akron
Akron Zips football seasons
Akron Zips football